The Faribault River is a tributary of the east bank of the Chibougamau River flowing into Eeyou Istchee Baie-James (municipality), in Jamésie, in the administrative region from Nord-du-Québec, in Quebec, Canada.

This river runs successively through the townships of Roy, Mackenzie and Blaiklock.

Forestry is the main economic activity of the sector; recreational tourism activities, second.

The Faribault River valley is served by the forest road (North-South direction) connected to the South at the route 167 which passes to Chibougamau.

The surface of the Faribault River is usually frozen from early November to mid-May, however, safe ice circulation is generally from mid-November to mid-April.

Geography

Toponymy
At various times in history, this territory has been occupied by the Attikameks, the Algonquins and the Crees.

This hydronym evokes the work of life of Eugène-Rodolphe Faribault (1869-1953), engineer. He was a member of the Mining Commission of Chibougamau, which was established in 1909 with the mission of assessing the mining potential of the region. This commission was composed of Dr. Alfred Ernest Barlow, P.Geo., J. C. Gwillim, Professor of Mining Engineering at Queen's University and A. Mr. Bateman, world-renowned geologist. In use since less than 1914, the hydroponym "Faribault River" was formalized on December 12, 1939, by the "Commission de géographie du Québec", the current Commission de toponymie du Québec.

The toponym "Faribault River" was formalized on December 5, 1968, at the Commission de toponymie du Québec, when it was created.

Notes and references

See also 

Rivers of Nord-du-Québec
Nottaway River drainage basin